Râmnicelu is a commune in Buzău County, Muntenia, Romania. It is composed of four villages: Colibași, Fotin, Râmnicelu and Știubei.

At the 2011 census, 57.1% of inhabitants were Romanians and 42.7% were Roma.

See also
Luceafărul Club Râmnicelu

Notes

Communes in Buzău County
Localities in Muntenia